Mehmetbulent Torpil (born June 17, 1965 in Ankara) is a Turkish sport shooter. He competed at the 1988 Summer Olympics in the mixed skeet event, in which he tied for 13th place.

References

1965 births
Living people
Skeet shooters
Turkish male sport shooters
Shooters at the 1988 Summer Olympics
Olympic shooters of Turkey
20th-century Turkish people